

Soviet Union

Ukraine

References

 
Karpaty Lviv
Seasons